Montijo is a former civil parish in the municipality of Montijo, central Portugal. In 2013, the parish merged into the new parish Montijo e Afonsoeiro. The population in 2021 was 55,732, in an area of  km².

References

Freguesias of Montijo, Portugal
Former parishes of Portugal